Project Runway Korea was the South Korean version of the American reality show Project Runway. It was Korean television's first localized franchise from a foreign-language reality competition, and the third Project Runway version in Asia after Malaysia and the Philippines.

The winner of Project Runway Koreas first season received ₩50 million in prize money, along with a car and a fashion spread in Elle Korea; the second season increased the prize money to ₩70 million.

The show's fifth and final season, an All Stars Season, concluded in May 2015.

Production
The show is hosted by Lee So-ra, supermodel, together with Editor-in-Chief of ELLE Korea Shin Yoo-jin and ANDY & DEBB designer Kim Seok-won completing the judging panel. Meanwhile, fashion design professor Kan Ho-sup serves as mentor to the designers.  Lee replaced Kang Ho-dong (comedian and variety show host), who was the choice to host Project Runway Korea, as FremantleMedia (international distributor of the Project Runway franchise) found it inappropriate to have a comedian in a fashion-related program. Over 500 designers auditioned, and 14 of them were chosen as finalists. The final three designers will get the chance to show their collection in the 2009 Fall/ Winter Seoul Collection, with the winner receiving 50 million won (roughly US$34,200), a 2009 GM Daewoo Lacetti and a fashion spread in ELLE Korea. The show premiered on cable network OnStyle on February 7, 2009.

News reports stated that the production company of Project Runway Korea paid 100 million won (roughly US$71,900) to purchase the franchise, which included a 700-page "bible" that details the program's format, production notes, and casting procedures. The whole season is said to have been produced at a budget of 700 million won (roughly US$506,100) for all of its 10 episodes, compared to Project Runway that has a production budget of 500 million won (roughly US$361,500) for every episode.

During the promotion of the program, the staff of Project Runway Korea stated that "everything about (Project Runway and its Korean version) is the same except for the color of the contestants' skin."

The first season will feature appearances from celebrity Uhm Jung-hwa, fashion photographer Gilles Bensimon, and designer from [[Project Runway (season 4)|Project Runway'''s fourth season]] Victorya Hong, who incidentally has Korean lineage.

As of Season 4, the show has begun filming in an HDTV format.

Season 1
[[File:ProjectRunwayKoreaCast.jpg|thumb|right|Project Runway Koreas host Lee So-ra (foreground) together with 14 designers competing in the program]]
Names of the designers are arranged in "Romanized" order, while the ages listed are the designers' ages at the time the show was taped in late 2008.

 The designer won Project Runway Korea.
 The designer won that challenge.
 The designer was in the top two, but did not win.
 The designer had one of the highest scores for that challenge, but did not win.
 The designer had one of the lowest scores for that challenge, but was not eliminated.
 The designer was in the bottom two, but was not eliminated.
 The designer lost and was out of the competition.

 : Kim Jae-min's team had one of the highest scores but because of his attitude, he was on the bottom 5.

Season 2

 The designer won Project Runway Korea.
 The designer won that challenge.
 The designer was in the top two, but did not win.
 The designer had one of the highest scores for that challenge, but did not win.
 The designer had one of the lowest scores for that challenge, but was not eliminated.
 The designer was in the bottom two, but was not eliminated.
 The designer lost and was out of the competition.

 : Two team's teamwork are worst. And all of contestants are critiqued.

Season 3

 The designer won Project Runway Korea.
 The designer won that challenge.
 The designer was in the top two, but did not win.
 The designer had one of the highest scores for that challenge, but did not win.
 The designer had one of the lowest scores for that challenge, but was not eliminated.
 The designer was in the bottom two, but was not eliminated.
 The designer lost and was out of the competition.

 : Jung Hee-jin was eliminated at panel, but was saved. Because all of contestants are critiqued.

Season 4

 The designer won Project Runway Korea.
 The designer won that challenge.
 The designer was in the top two, but did not win.
 The designer had one of the highest scores for that challenge, but did not win.
 The designer had one of the lowest scores for that challenge, but was not eliminated.
 The designer was in the bottom two, but was not eliminated.
 The designer lost and was out of the competition.

 : In episode 1, Nam Bo-ra, Park Jung-sang, Back Ye-jin, Lee Kyung-hae, and Jung Yong-jin were the 5 designers who were eliminated before the final 15 were officially participants of the show.

All-STARS

 The designer won Project Runway Korea.
 The designer won that challenge.
 The designer was in the top two, but did not win.
 The designer had one of the highest scores for that challenge, but did not win.
 The designer had one of the lowest scores for that challenge, but was not eliminated.
 The designer was in the bottom two, but was not eliminated.
 The designer lost and was out of the competition.

 :Jung Jae-woong was eliminated at panel, but was saved. Because judges thought that he had potential, and stayed in the competition.
 :Lee Myung-sin & Lim Je-yoon's design was considered good even though they are received a low score to lose the battle.
 :Jung Mi-young's design was considered good even though her group received a low score.

References in popular culture
On March 28, 2009, Muhan Dojeon, the top-rating comic-variety programme in Korea, broadcast a special episode titled "Project RunAway" (프로젝트 런어웨이) (episode 147) to test each of the member's commercial design ability, with the host of PRK, Lee So-ra. The main challenge given to each member was made by comedian Kim Gyeong-min's request, to design his comic dress to wear at the MBC's variety programme Happy-Time''. At last, surprisingly, the winner of this neck-and-neck competition is Park Myeong-su by the judges' Rock-paper-scissors decision. This free-to-air episode also marked the highest ratings of the series.

External links
 Official website
 Official blog
 Kye Han-hee website (Season 1)

References

South Korean reality television series
Project Runway
2009 South Korean television series debuts
2015 South Korean television series endings
2010s South Korean television series
South Korean television series based on American television series
South Korean fashion